Employment Relations Act (with its variations) is a stock short title used in New Zealand and in the United Kingdom for legislation relating to employment relations.

List

New Zealand
The Employment Relations Act 2000 (No 24)
The Employment Relations (Validation of Union Registration and Other Matters) Amendment Act 2001 (No 91)
The Employment Relations Amendment Act 2004 (No 43)
The Employment Relations Amendment Act (No 2) 2004 (No 86)
The Employment Relations Amendment Act 2006 (No 41)
The Employment Relations Amendment Act 2007 (No 2)
The Employment Relations (Flexible Working Arrangements) Amendment Act 2007 (No 105)
The Employment Relations (Breaks, Infant Feeding, and Other Matters) Amendment Act 2008 (No 58)
The Employment Relations Amendment Act 2008 (No 106)
The Employment Relations (Film Production Work) Amendment Act 2010 (No 120)
The Employment Relations Amendment Act 2010 (No 125)

United Kingdom
The Employment Relations Act 1999
The Employment Relations Act 2004

See also
List of short titles

Lists of legislation by short title